A Grotrian diagram, or term diagram, shows the allowed electronic transitions between the energy levels of atoms.  They can be used for one-electron and multi-electron atoms.  They take into account the specific selection rules related to changes in angular momentum of the electron. The diagrams are named after Walter Grotrian, who introduced them in his 1928 book Graphische Darstellung der Spektren von Atomen und Ionen mit ein, zwei und drei Valenzelektronen ("Graphical representation of the spectra of atoms and ions with one, two and three valence electrons").

See also
Jablonski diagram (for molecules)

References

External links
 Hyperphysics: Atomic Energy Level Diagrams

Volumes with Grotrian diagrams of most elements
Atomic energy-level and Grotrian diagrams by Stanley Bashkin and John O. Stoner, Jr.
 Volume I: Hydrogen - Phosphorus
 Volume I: Hydrogen - Phosphorus (Addenda)
 Volume III
 Volume IV

Diagrams
Spectroscopy
Atomic physics
Photochemistry